Patrice Kwedi (born 30 September 1983, in Yaoundé) is a football player from Cameroon who plays for Sesvetski Kraljevec as a right back.

Career
Kwedi has previously played in the Croatian Prva HNL for NK Dinamo Zagreb, NK Inter Zaprešić and HNK Šibenik. Kwedi was also playing for Croatian lower-league clubs NK Zelina and NK Dugo Selo before joining NK Sesvete in spring 2011.

As of 2015 Kwedi worked as a warehouse worker for the Croatian retail chain Konzum. Since 2016, and as of 2019, Kwedi has been actively playing for the fifth-tier side Sesvetski Kraljevec.

Personal life
Patrice Kwedi is married to a Croatian woman, and despite his background, he speaks Croatian very well.

References

External links
 1. HNL stats at HRrepka.

1983 births
Living people
Footballers from Yaoundé
Cameroonian footballers
Cameroonian expatriate footballers
Association football defenders
Croatian Football League players
Danish Superliga players
Allsvenskan players
GNK Dinamo Zagreb players
NK Inter Zaprešić players
HNK Šibenik players
NK Zelina players
NK Karlovac players
NK Pomorac 1921 players
NK Novalja players
NK Sesvete players
Aarhus Gymnastikforening players
IFK Göteborg players
Cameroonian expatriate sportspeople in Croatia
Cameroonian expatriate sportspeople in Sweden
Cameroonian expatriate sportspeople in Denmark
Expatriate footballers in Croatia
Expatriate footballers in Sweden
Expatriate men's footballers in Denmark